N. Vembusamy Sankaran (4 January 1954 – 15 January 2018), known popularly as Gnani, was an Indian journalist and writer in Tamil language. He wrote articles under the pseudonyms Vamban, Cynic and Nandan, and is known for frank and uncompromising views on politics and culture, which he has expressed in the media for 30 years. He functioned in multiple roles in newspapers, magazines, plays and films. His son Manush Nandan works as a cinematographer in Tamil cinema.

Early life 
Gnani was born to Jayalakshmi and N. Vembusamy on 4 January 1954 in Chengalpattu, a town in India's erstwhile Madras State (now Tamil Nadu), where he was also schooled. His father worked as a journalist with an English daily. As a student Gnani showed interest in oratory, writing and acting. He was a part of first Rail Passenger's Association. He graduated from the Madras Christian College.

Career
He started as court reporter for Indian Express, when he reported on embarrassing gaffes for the judiciary. Eventually he fought with Indian Express. Although he was fired, he successfully sued them for breach of labour laws. He soon joined eminent Tamil magazine Ananda Vikatan, becoming a sure investigative journalist.

He soon became editor of his own magazines. He reported on Madras Atomic Power Plant, drawing CBI sleuths who looked for his source.

Gnani was the editor of a Tamil magazine Dheemtharikida, which was first published in printed form and then in electronic form. Now his official website www.gnani.net launched on 2 October 2008 contains "o pakkangal" which he is currently writing on Kalki, updated everyweek. It also contains some of old dheemtharikida articles and the others he wrote on the year 2010 as well as info about all his areas of activities - theatre, video, print etc.

Death
On 15 January 2018, Gnani died suddenly at 12.30 am at his home in KK Nagar, Chennai at the age of 64. It is said that he had been suffering from kidney ailments for a few years and had been undergoing regular dialysis. His sudden demise has shocked journalists, writers and activists in Tamil Nadu. Tributes have been pouring in online from readers and colleagues. His body was donated to Rajiv Gandhi Government General Hospital-Medical College.

Books
Balloon (Play)
Pazhaya Paper (collection of his articles)
Marupadiyum (collection of his articles)
Media UravugaL
Samoogappaalinam: Mediavum Kalviyum
keLvigaL (Interviews of cult figures between 1982–2003)
Manithan PathilgaL (Answers for the readers’ questions in Dinamani Kathir between 1996–1999)
Kandathai SolgirEn (Collection of articles published in India Today)
En sankara madaththai kaappaatra vEndum?
oozhalE un vEr engE?
Thavippu
aappiL dhEsam (Travelogue series published in dinamani kathir a Sunday magazine)

Television
 Thik thik thik- suntv as serial killer
Vinnilirunthu Mannukku
Picknik
vErgaL-Viduthalai pOraattamum pennurimai iyakkamum
Iyya-periyaar – E.Ve.Raa's life story
 Malara thudikkum mottukkal (Doordarshan)

Plays
More than 30 plays for the troupe Pareeksha
 Kolam - A Mission towards Meaningful cinema

To promote humane values and clean entertainment in the fields of arts and literature, by producing works of art and literature.

Magazines

Columns
He was writing the column "O Pakkangal"  in the magazine "Kalki" (earlier in Ananda Vikatan & Kumudam). It gained great popularity among the Tamil readers. The "O PakkangaL" has been released in two books from "Vikatan Publications" and is a bestseller.
He was also writing the column "Neruppu MalargaL" in AvaL Vikatan (a Tamil magazine for women). The column has been published in book form from Vikatan Publication.
Because of some controversies, he opted out off Anantha Vikatan, was writing articles under the same title in Kumudam for a brief period. Owing to problems (reasons unknown),'O Pakkangal' in now a part of Kalki, another popular Tamil Magazine.

Contributions
Gnani contributed his thoughts in the following periodicals and still writing to many periodicals.
Indian Express
Junior Vikatan
Junior Post
Murasoli
Ethiroli
Dinamani
Chutti Vikatan
Aval Vikatan
Ananda Vikatan
Kumudam
Kalki Magazine

See also
 List of Indian writers

References

External links 
 Kolam

1954 births
2018 deaths
Indian male journalists
Tamil journalists
Tamil-language writers
People from Kanchipuram district
Madras Christian College alumni